Charter Oak State College is a public online college based in New Britain, Connecticut. The college was founded in 1973 by the Connecticut Legislature and offers associate, bachelor's, and master's degrees. The college is adjacent to Central Connecticut State University and is named for Connecticut's famous Charter Oak.

Charter Oak State College is part of the Connecticut State Colleges and Universities. It is accredited by the New England Commission of Higher Education and functions under the degree-granting authority of the Connecticut Board of Regents for Higher Education. Previously, the Board for State Academic Awards (BSAA), established in 1973, granted degrees through Charter Oak State College. In 2012, the Connecticut Board of Regents for Higher Education replaced the BSAA as Charter Oak State College's governing body.

Charter Oak State College is a distance learning institution that mainly serves the adult population and allows different opportunities for credit to be earned compared to a tradition college. Charter Oak has awarded over 16,000 degrees since its founding in 1973.

Academics
Charter Oak State College can award the Associate degree (in both arts and science), the Bachelor of Arts degree, the Bachelor of Science degree, and, since 2015, the Master of Science degree. The bachelor's degree programs include several majors, as well as a General Studies degree with a wide selection of concentrations.

Student demographics
Charter Oak State College's adult students include the military, civilian federal and state employees, working adults pursuing first or second degrees, and students taking additional coursework in preparation for graduate school. Charter Oak State College's students are 65% female, 35% male and range in age from 17 to 72, with an average age of 39. 69% of Charter Oak's students are Connecticut residents.

Notable alumni

 Bobby Gibson, educator and politician
 Marvin Jones, professional football player
 Jason Murphey, politician
 Zach Payne, politician
 Peter Reinhart, baker, educator, and author
 Jerome Tang, college basketball coach
 Al Terzi, news anchor
 Larry Valencia, politician

References

External links
Official website

Buildings and structures in New Britain, Connecticut
Public universities and colleges in Connecticut
Distance education institutions based in the United States
Educational institutions established in 1973
Universities and colleges in Hartford County, Connecticut
Liberal arts colleges in Connecticut
1973 establishments in Connecticut